Wray Community District Hospital is a community hospital in Wray, Colorado. Built in 1995, the hospital has fifteen beds.

The hospital is a Level IV trauma center.

References

External links
Hospital website

Hospitals in Colorado
Buildings and structures in Yuma County, Colorado
Hospital buildings completed in 1995